Rodney McCray may refer to:
 Rodney McCray (basketball), basketball player who played in the NBA for several teams
 Rodney McCray (baseball), baseball player best known for crashing through the outfield wall of Civic Stadium in Portland, Oregon